Bierzwnica  (formerly German Reinfeld) is a village in the administrative district of Gmina Świdwin, within Świdwin County, West Pomeranian Voivodeship, in north-western Poland.

References 

Villages in Świdwin County